Al Washington (born April 22, 1984) is an American football coach and former player who is the defensive run game coordinator and defensive line coach for Notre Dame. He most recently served as the Linebackers coach for Ohio State. He was formerly the Michigan linebackers coach in 2018.

Early career
Washington attended Bishop Watterson High School in Columbus, Ohio. Washington was the 2001 co-Defensive Player of the Year in Division II and led the Eagles to the state championship game.

Washington was a three-year starter and four-year letterwinner as a defensive tackle for Boston College, from 2002 to 2005.

Coaching career

Ohio State
Washington was hired by Ohio State on January 7, 2019, to be the new linebackers coach.

Notre Dame
On January 16, 2022, he was hired by Notre Dame to be the new defensive run game coordinator and defensive line coach. He replaces Mike Elston, who left for the defensive line job at his alma mater, Michigan.

Personal life
Al Washington and his wife Melissa have one son named Michael and a daughter, Audrey.

References

External links
 Ohio State Buckeyes bio

1984 births
Living people
American football defensive tackles
Boston College Eagles football coaches
Boston College Eagles football players
Elon Phoenix football coaches
Michigan Wolverines football coaches
NC State Wolfpack football coaches
Ohio State Buckeyes football coaches
RPI Engineers football coaches
Slippery Rock football coaches
Sportspeople from Columbus, Ohio
Players of American football from Columbus, Ohio
African-American coaches of American football
African-American players of American football